Antoinette Spolar is an American actress who is best known for playing the role of Larry David's receptionist on the hit HBO series Curb Your Enthusiasm. She has made many guest appearances on shows such as Friends and Cow and Chicken. She was also an impersonator on Invader Zim that voiced a few background characters, notably Jessica. The celebrities she impersonated were Haylie Duff, Sheryl Crow, and Edie McClurg.

References

External links

Living people
American actresses
Year of birth missing (living people)
21st-century American women